Fredrik Schulte, born in 1981, is a Swedish politician and member of the Moderate Party. He has been a member of the Riksdag since 2006. He is a member of the Committee on Taxation.

References

Members of the Riksdag from the Moderate Party
1981 births
Living people
Members of the Riksdag 2006–2010
Members of the Riksdag 2010–2014